Nabil Emad Aly Elmahdy (born 6 April 1996) also known as Donga, is an Egyptian professional footballer who plays as a defensive midfielder for Zamalek SC in the Egyptian Premier League.

Club career
In 2016, Emad was transferred from Beni Ebeid, a team in the Egyptian Third Division, to Pyramids FC (then known as Al-Assiouty Sport) for 40,000 Egyptian pounds. He signed a 5-year contract.

International
He made his debut for the Egypt national football team on 23 March 2019 in an Africa Cup qualifier against Niger, as a starter.

References

External links
Nabil Dunga at KOOORA.com

1996 births
Living people
Egyptian footballers
Egypt international footballers
Association football midfielders
Egyptian Premier League players
Place of birth missing (living people)
Pyramids FC players
2019 Africa Cup of Nations players